The Interstate Insurance Product Regulation Commission is an organization that promotes standards for life insurance products in the United States.

The Commission was created in 2000 by members of the National Association of Insurance Commissioners.  Its mission statement is to "serve[] insurance regulators, consumers and providers by improving the efficiency and effectiveness in the ever-changing insurance marketplace."  It serves as a clearinghouse for insurance companies' policy form filings.

References

Professional associations based in the United States
Insurance in the United States
Organizations established in 2000
Insurance organizations
Insurance regulation
Regulation in the United States